Sifton may refer to:

Places:
 Rural Municipality of Sifton,a rural municipality in the Virden region of Manitoba, Canada
 Sifton, Manitoba, an unincorporated community in the Virden region
 Sifton, Washington, an unincorporated community
 Sifton Ranges, a mountain range in British Columbia, Canada
 Sifton Park, Edmonton, a neighbourhood in Edmonton, Alberta

People:
 Arthur Sifton (1858–1921), Canadian politician and second Premier of Alberta 
 Charles Proctor Sifton (1935–2009), American federal judge
 Sir Clifford Sifton (1861–1929), Canadian politician and Minister of the Interior of Canada
 John Wright Sifton (1833–1912), Canadian businessman and later a politician in Manitoba
 Sam Sifton (born 1966), American journalist